It Shouldn't Happen to a Vet (in the United States also known as All Things Bright and Beautiful), is a 1976 sequel to the 1975 film All Creatures Great and Small. Although having the same title as James Herriot's second novel, the film is actually based on his third and fourth novels, Let Sleeping Vets Lie and Vet in Harness, which in the United States were released as a compilation volume titled All Things Bright and Beautiful. It is part of a series of movies and television series based on Herriot's novels.

In this film, John Alderton has taken over the role of James and Colin Blakely that of Siegfried (portrayed in the first film by Simon Ward and Anthony Hopkins, respectively), while Lisa Harrow returns as Helen. It also features Richard Griffiths in his debut film appearance as Sam. The film was directed by Eric Till, and the screenplay is by Alan Plater. The film, which has a British-American joint venture, was entered into the 10th Moscow International Film Festival.

Synopsis
The story continues where All Creatures Great and Small ended, and follows the lives of James, Helen and Siegfried from 1938 until the outbreak of war.

Main cast
 
 John Alderton as James Herriott
 Colin Blakely as Siegfried Farnon
 Lisa Harrow as Helen
 Bill Maynard as Hinchcliffe
 Paul Shelley as Richard
 Richard Pearson as Granville
 Rosemary Martin as Mrs Dalby
 Raymond Francis as Colonel Bosworth
 John Barrett as Crump
 Philip Stone as Jack
 Clifford Kershaw as Kendall
 Kevin Moreton as William
 Liz Smith as Mrs Dodds
 Leslie Sarony as Kirby
 Gwen Nelson as Mrs Kirby

Production
The film was known during production as All Things Bright and Beautiful.

Home media
Released on VHS in the 1990s, the film has yet to see a commercial release on DVD in the UK (region 2) or US (region 1).

References

External links
 
 
 Official James Herriot Website

1977 films
1977 drama films
British drama films
Films directed by Eric Till
Films scored by Laurie Johnson
Films set in Yorkshire
Medical-themed films
EMI Films films
1970s English-language films
1970s British films